Cross River South Senatorial District is in Cross River State, Nigeria. It covers seven local governments areas of the state. Gershom Bassey of the People’s Democratic Party (PDP) is the current senator representing the Cross River South Senatorial District at the Nigerian senate assembly. On 24 May 2020, the Nigerian Navy arrested 42 suspected cultists during initiation at Akpabuyo LGA in Cross River South Senatorial District.

In early 2020, some persons from the Cross Rivers State senatorial district, under the aegis of Cross River South Stakeholders Group and headed by High Chief Ita Ewa Henshaw, tried to recall the Senator representing the district by writing a petition of recall to the Independent National Electoral Commission (INEC). The petition generated a lot of controversies but failed in its intended purpose.

List of senators representing Cross River South

See also 

 Cross River State

References 

Politics of Cross River State
Local Government Areas in Cross River State
Senatorial districts in Nigeria